The Top 100 Contractors Report (TCR 100) is a list developed annually by the U.S. General Services Administration as part of its tracking of U.S. federal government procurement, of the "Top 100" contractors in the United States.

In fiscal year 2005, the federal government aimed to source 23% of all subcontracts from small businesses with guidance from the Small Business Administration. The federal government was unable to meet this goal in 8 years until FY2013 when it subcontracted over $83 billion from small businesses.

Fiscal year 2015 marked several historic achievements; the federal government exceeded their overall goal of 23% by 2.75% resulting in $90.7 billion dollars awarded to small businesses, 5.05% ($17.8 billion) of which went to women-owned small business (WOSB), meeting the goal for the first time since it was implemented in 1996.

The top five departments by dollars obligated in 2015 were the Department of Defense ($212.5 billion), Department of Energy ($23 billion), Health and Human Services ($21 billion), Department of Veteran Affairs ($20 billion), and NASA ($13 billion).

2018

2015

Fiscal years 2008, 2009 and 2010

See also
 Government procurement in the United States
Government procurement
Federal Acquisition Regulation
Federal Procurement Data System
Sustainable procurement
 Berry Amendment - requiring the Department of Defense to give preference in procurement to domestic goods and services
Military–industrial complex

References

External links 
 BGOV200 - Federal Industry Leaders: The Top Federal Contractors in FY20
 Federal Procurement Data System	
 Federal Contractor Misconduct Database
 New York Times article
 Advance GSA

Government procurement in the United States
Economy-related lists of superlatives
United States politics-related lists